Yenith Elizabett Bailey de la Cruz (born 29 March 2001) is a Panamanian footballer who plays as a goalkeeper for Paraguayan club Libertad/Limpeño and the Panama women's national team.

International career
Bailey appeared in three matches for Panama at the 2018 CONCACAF Women's Championship, making 24 saves. She won the tournament's Golden Glove award and was named to its Best XI. Previously a midfielder, she was converted to goalkeeper by head coach Victor Suárez only a year before the tournament.

Panama ended up fourth, advancing to a playoff against CONMEBOL side Argentina for a place in the 2019 Women's World Cup. In the 8th minute of the first leg Bailey saved a penalty from Estefanía Banini. The match finished 4-0 for Argentina, though, and after a 1-1 draw at home Panama was eliminated.

See also
 List of Panama women's international footballers

References

2001 births
Living people
Sportspeople from Panama City
Panamanian women's footballers
Women's association football goalkeepers
Panama women's international footballers
Pan American Games competitors for Panama
Footballers at the 2019 Pan American Games
Panamanian expatriate women's footballers
Panamanian expatriate sportspeople in Paraguay
Expatriate women's footballers in Paraguay